Youn Hyun-jung (born 14 March 1979) is a South Korean taekwondo practitioner. 

She won a gold medal in heavyweight at the 2003 World Taekwondo Championships in Garmisch-Partenkirchen, by defeating Chen Zhong in the semifinal, and Nataša Vezmar in the final. She won a silver medal at the 2002 Asian Games, after being defeated by Wang I-hsien in the final.

References

External links

1979 births
Living people
South Korean female taekwondo practitioners
Taekwondo practitioners at the 2002 Asian Games
Asian Games medalists in taekwondo
Medalists at the 2002 Asian Games
Asian Games silver medalists for South Korea
World Taekwondo Championships medalists
21st-century South Korean women